Prunum guttatum is a species of sea snail, a marine gastropod mollusk in the family Marginellidae, the margin snails.

Description
The shell is oval with the spire concealed. It is covered with transverse oval spots margined with white, somewhat ocellate, and disposed longitudinally.

Distribution
P. guttatum can be found in Caribbean waters, ranging from eastern Florida to Colombia and the Virgin Islands.

References

Marginellidae
Gastropods described in 1817
Fauna of the Caribbean
Fauna of the Dominican Republic